Sidi Napon (born 29 August 1972) is a Burkinabé footballer. He played in nine matches for the Burkina Faso national football team from 1995 to 1998. He was also named in Burkina Faso's squad for the 1998 African Cup of Nations tournament.

References

External links
 

1972 births
Living people
Burkinabé footballers
Burkina Faso international footballers
1996 African Cup of Nations players
1998 African Cup of Nations players
Place of birth missing (living people)
Association footballers not categorized by position
21st-century Burkinabé people